The Roman Catholic Diocese of Vilkaviškis is a diocese located in the city of Vilkaviškis in the Ecclesiastical province of Kaunas in Lithuania. It was established on April 4, 1926 from the Diocese of Łomża, Poland.

Special churches 
Minor Basilicas:
Šv. arkangelo Mykolo bazilika (Basilica of St. Michael the Archangel), Marijampolė.

Leadership 
 Bishops of Vilkaviškis (Roman rite)
 Bishop Rimantas Norvila (since 2002.01.05)
 Bishop Juozas Žemaitis, M.I.C. (1991.12.24 – 2002.01.05)
 Bishop Juozas Žemaitis, M.I.C. (Apostolic Administrator 1988.04.27 – 1991.12.24)
 Archbishop Liudas Povilonis, M.I.C. (Apostolic Administrator 1979.05.28 – 1988.04.27)
 Bishop Antanas Karosas (1926.04.05 – 1947.07.07)

References 
 GCatholic.org
 Catholic Hierarchy
 Diocese website

Roman Catholic dioceses in Lithuania
Christian organizations established in 1926
Roman Catholic dioceses and prelatures established in the 20th century